Pedro Duro Benito (1810–1886) was an important Spanish businessman of the 19th century; founder of the  industrial group Duro Felguera and a pioneer of ironworking in Spain.

Biography
Duro was born in Brieva de Cameros, La Rioja, and he died in the Principality of Asturias in 1886. He began construction on the Felguera Factory in 1857; a metallurgical factory that became the most important in Spain in the 19th century, and through the 20th century until the 1960s. It was the first major ironworks that were constructed in Spain. His descendants were created Marquesses of La Felguera by King Alfonso XIII. In addition, Duro was awarded the Order of Isabella the Catholic and the Légion d'honneur from the French government. He was buried in La Felguera, where the workers of his factory raised a big monument. He was also a pioneer in social measures for workers. His work motivated, in addition, industrial expansion in the north of Spain. Today the company that he created is called "Duro Felguera" and it has been traded on the Spanish stock exchange since 1902.

Further reading
 Francisco Palacios, Pedro Duro, un capitán de la industria española,  Grupo Duro Felguera, 2008  
 Germán Ojeda, Duro Felguera, Historia de una gran empresa industrial, Grupo Duro Felguera, 2000

References

1811 births
1886 deaths
19th-century Spanish businesspeople
People from Langreo
People from La Rioja